In many denominations of the Christian Church, a Church usher (not to be confused with church greeter) is responsible for seating guests and maintaining the order and security of services. The role of a church usher is typically a volunteer position, and in the past was often considered one of honor, particularly if a church committee selects an usher by a nomination.

History 

The concept of an usher is not new. In the Old Testament, there were positions addressed as "Doorkeepers" or "Gatekeepers", and their roles were very similar.(2 Kings 22:4) (1 Chronicles 9:17-27) (Psalms 84:10)

Jesus' disciples could be considered ushers, in the sense that they:
Prepared the way for Jesus
Kept order among those listening to Christ
Served food to the audience
Cleaned up after a service, such as the Feeding of the Five Thousand.

Organization 
Churches often have a group of people that work as ushers led by a head usher. The ushers typically receive their instructions from the head usher. The head usher receives instructions directly from the pastor and is responsible for training and scheduling ushers.

Dress 
Traditionally ushers wore three piece suits. In most contemporary churches, a more casual dress style has become acceptable.

Duties 
The church usher has various duties. Depending on the church's denomination, size, and preferences, ushers may perform some or all of the following:
 Seat guests
 Collect the tithes and offering
 Distribute communion 
 Keep order at the entrance of the sanctuary
 Distribute bulletins and service programs
 Handle disturbances

References

External links 

 How to Usher in a Church - wikiHow
 Plusline:Usher Ministry Description

Christian worship roles
Christian religious occupations
Ushers